Neuilly-Crimolois is a commune in the Côte-d'Or department in eastern France. It was established on 28 February 2019 by merger of the former communes of Neuilly-lès-Dijon (the seat) and Crimolois.

Transportation
The commune has a railway station, on the Dijon–Vallorbe line.

Population

See also
Communes of the Côte-d'Or department

References

Communes of Côte-d'Or
2019 establishments in France
Populated places established in 2019